Kiwai is a Papuan language, or languages, of southern Papua New Guinea. Dialects number 1,300 Kope, 700 Gibaio, 1,700 Urama, 700 Arigibi (together "Northeast Kiwai"), 3,800 Coast, 1,000 Daru, 4,500 Island, 400 Doumori (together "Southern Kiwai"). Wurm and Hattori (1981) classify Arigibi as a separate language.

Introduction 
Kiwai Island is a long/low island located on the Eastern side of the Southern entrance to the delta of the Fly River (Papua).

Gender 
Kiwai is gender free; male and female is shown by specific terms when needed.

Alphabet 

 17 Letters
 vowels: a, e, i, o, u (diphthongs are combinations of any two vowels, e.g. ai, au, oi, ou, ei, etc.)
 Consonants: k, g, t, s, d, n, r, p, b, m, v, h
 Semivowel: w/u, i/y /j/

Parts of speech 
Parts of speech are associated with the standard European parts of speech, somewhat inelegantly. The three major parts of speech are Nominals, Verbs and Particles:

Nominals
 Nouns, Adjectives, Pronouns (Personal and Relative), Interrogative words, Nominal adverbs, Numerals

Nominals are declined for case (including the ergative).

Verbs
 Verbs

Particles 
 Interrogative particles, Particle Adverbs, Postpositions, Interjections, Particle Conjunctions

Nouns 
While most nouns in Kiwai are mono-morphemic, many are derived or compounds, such as verbal nouns, nominalised adjectives, attribute-category compounds,  and so on. Reduplication also exists, usually creating an intensification of the core meaning, distributive effect, and so on.

Derivation is by prefixing and/or suffixing. For example, verbal nouns are created by prefixing k- to the verb word-base.

Adjectives 
Like all other languages in the Torres Strait area as well as Torres Strait Creole, adjectives precede nouns. Various derived adjectives exist, such as Verbal Adjectives, Proprietive, Negative, Similative, and Assertative. 

Interrogatives can be created using the Interrogative Prefix.

Pronouns 
Personal pronouns indicate person and number (singular, dual, plural, trial), do not indicate gender, and are declined for case, including the ergative and genitive. The 1st person non-singular, unlike other languages in the area, does not distinguish inclusive and exclusive.

Verbs 
Verbs are highly complex, consisting of a "verbal word-base" and various prefixes and suffixes, amrkjing for tense, aspect, mood and cross-marking for subject and object. Verbal Word-Bases always begin and end with a vowel or a diphthong. It is the simplest form of a verb that is used in speech forms.

Syntax 
Syntax is the arrangement of words in order to create a well-structured sentence. For the Kiwai language, there are principal rules for the positioning of words.

 The subject precedes verb/predicate
 The D.O (direct object) precedes the verb, which then follows the subject
 The word that modifies the subject/object precedes
 Numerals precede nouns
 Sometimes the extensions of the predicate precede the verb
 If time is involved, the indications of time will normally appear at the beginning of a sentence
 Infinitive phrases will appear at the end of sentences
 Particles will precede the verb

Number 

 Number can be indicated by verbal suffixes
 Most nouns do not mark for number (few nouns have a separate plural form)

Dialects 
There are six main dialects of this language.

Mawata-Daru-Tureture Kiwai
 Southern Kiwai
 from Parema north on the and neighbouring islands, includsing Kiwai Island.
 Adopted as the standard language for mission purposes in the Delta (by the London Missionary Society)
 Domori
 an island in the Fly Delta northwest of Kiwai
 Wabuda
 an island between the Eastern mouth of the Fly and Bamu Delta
 Sisiami
 Village on the Dibiri branch of the Bamu Delta
 Goaribari
 Mouth of the Bamu Delta

While Kiwai dialects differ in terms of vocabulary, pronunciation and grammar, differences are minor.

Vocabulary – Kiwai And English 
E. Baxter Riley, had collected words to be added in the Kiwai-English vocabulary. A lot of the texts and translations have been modified and added by S.H.R.

Verbal Forms: Verbs will be placed under the simple form of the word-base, under the five vowels (a,e,i,o,u). Compounds are followed immediately after. However some of the compounds will be located only under some prefixes. These prefixes being: ar, em, emar, emow, er, erem, im, imar, imow, ir, irim, iriw, irow, iw, iwar, or, oror, ow, owar, and owor. The word-base, will then be located by ignoring the following initial letters/syllables in words.

Evolution

Below are some reflexes of proto-Trans-New Guinea proposed by Pawley (2012). The dialect given is Island Kiwai, unless otherwise indicated.

{| class="wikitable sortable"
! proto-Trans-New Guinea !! Kiwai (Island)
|-
| *tukumba[C] ‘short’ || (?) kopu
|-
| *takVn[V] ‘moon’ || sagana
|-
| *sumbu ‘white ashes’ || tuwo
|-
| *pi(n,nd)a ‘sister’ || abida
|-
| *niman ‘louse’ || nimo
|-
| *ni ‘1PL’ || ni(mo)
|-
| *mbena ‘arm’ || (Kerewo Kiwai bena ‘shoulder’)
|-
| *mb(i,u)t(i,u)C ‘fingernail’ || pitu
|-
| *maŋgat[a] ‘teeth, mouth’ || mangota, magata
|-
| *m(i,u)ndu ‘nose’ || wodi (Gope (N.E. Kiwai) modi)
|-
| *kV(mb,p)(i,u)t(i,u) ‘head’ || epuru, (Wabuda kepuru)
|-
| *kuk(a,u)m(o,u) ‘cold’ || (Bamu kukamu, Sisiame kukamo)
|-
| *ka(nd,t)(e,i)kV ‘ear’ || gare
|-
| *k(a,o]ndok[V] ‘foot’ || Gope (N.E. Kiwai) oto, Morigi kota
|-
| *inja ‘tree, wood, fire’ || (S. Kiwai era)
|-
| *amu ‘breast’ || amo
|-
| *a(mb,m)u ‘tail’ || (?) wapo
|-
| *(nd,s)umu(n,t)[V] ‘hair’ || (?) muso (metathesis?)
|}

Videos 
 https://www.youtube.com/watch?v=u_XeP9DxsKU
 https://www.youtube.com/watch?v=iB3Co9ggY10
 2 hour long film: "The Jesus Film"

Further reading

Urama

La Trobe University 

 Sidney Ray, A Grammar of the Kiwai Language, Fly Delta, Papua, with a Kiwai Vocabulary (London Missionary Society: Edward George Baker, 1931)

External links 
 A number of collections in Paradisec include Southern Kiwai materials

References

Kiwaian languages
Languages of Gulf Province